Baylor Scott & White Medical Center – Plano, commonly referred to as Baylor Plano, is a medical center in Plano, Texas. Founded in 2004, the center is part of the larger Baylor Scott & White healthcare system.

Christopher Duntsch scandal
The center is notable for being one of the workplaces of Dr. Christopher Duntsch, a neurosurgeon convicted in 2017 of injury to an elderly person and assault for gross medical malpractice. Duntsch performed 33 surgeries that resulted in the maiming or death of his patients. Baylor-Plano failed to report Duntsch either to the Texas Medical Board or the National Practitioner Data Bank, instead allowing him to resign and offering a letter indicating that there were no areas of concern with regard to his performance.

References 

Hospitals in Texas
Hospitals established in 2004